Honoré is a name of French origin and may refer to several people or places:

Given name

Sovereigns of Monaco

Lords of Monaco
Honoré I of Monaco

Princes of Monaco
Honoré II of Monaco
Honoré III of Monaco
Honoré IV of Monaco
Honoré V of Monaco

Other people
Honoré de Balzac, (1799–1850) French novelist and playwright
Honoré Beaugrand, (1848–1906) Canadian journalist and politician
Honoré Daumier, (1808–1879) French artist
Jean-Honoré Fragonard, (1732–1806) French painter
Honoré Willsie Morrow (1880-1940), American author, magazine editor
Honoré Gabriel Riqueti, comte de Mirabeau, (1749–1791) French writer and statesman
Honoré d'Urfé, (1568–1625) French novelist

Surname
Carl Honoré, Canadian journalist
Christophe Honoré, (b. 1970) French writer and director
Dalton W. Honoré (b. 1943) American politician
Hector Honoré, (1905–1983) American auto racer
Henry Honoré, (Henry Hamilton Honoré, c. 1824–1916) American businessman 
 Philippe Honoré (cartoonist), killed in the Charlie Hebdo shooting 
Philippe Honoré (violinist), French-born violinist
Russel L. Honoré, (b. 1947) U.S. Army General
Tony Honoré (A. M. (Tony) Honoré), (b. 1921) British lawyer and jurist
Jean Marcel Honoré, (1920–2013) French Catholic cardinal

Places
Rue du Faubourg Saint-Honoré, a street in Paris, France
Honoré, the main town on the fictional island of Saint Marie in the television show Death in Paradise

See also
 Honorius (disambiguation)

References

Masculine given names
French masculine given names